Hora Sara is an ancient treatise on Hindu astrology, specifically as it relates to Divination. It was written in Sanskrit Sloka format. Its author, Prithuyasas, was the son of Varahamihira (505–587 CE). Prithuyasas contradicts his father; for example, in respect to Vihaga yoga, a Nabhasa yoga that arises when all planets occupy the 4th and the 10th, he has assigned auspicious results. 

Hora Sara was represented in Hora Ratna of Bala Bhadra authored during the reign of Mughal Emperor Shah Jahan. Where the author writes, "Just as Varaha is a synonym of astrology, his son, Prithuyasas, occupies the zenith in the astrology’s world through his work, Hora Sara".

This work on astrology covers a wide range of topics through its 32 chapters:
 characteristics and nature of signs
 characteristics and nature of planets
 evaluation of strengths of planets
 births
 bad and evil indications at time of birth
 Arishta yogas
 longevity
 effects of planetary periods in general and of seven planets
 miscellaneous dasha effects
 effects of Ashtakavarga
 effects of sub-periods of planets
 effects of Chandra yogas and Nabhasa yogas
 Raja yogas
 results of planets in various houses
 implication of Karma bhava i.e. the 10th house
 effects of conjunction of two or more planets
 results of adverse combinations
 female horoscopy
 death
 lost horoscopy
 qualities of Constellations
 results of Chandra-rasi at birth
 effects of births in different amass
 Nakshatra dasha results 
 Jataka lakshana
 results of omens

References

Sanskrit texts
Hindu astrological texts